The Northeast Coast National Scenic Area is an area in northeastern Taiwan with special geographical and historical distinction.

Location
The Scenic Area ranges from Nanya Borough, Ruifang District, New Taipei in the north to North Porth of Toucheng Township, Yilan County, and covers Ruifang and Gongliao District of New Taipei and Toucheng Township of Yilan.

History
In December 1979, the "Report for Northeast Coast Special Scenic Area Planning" by the Tourism Bureau, Department of Transportation of the ROC (Taiwan) was commended to National Chengchi University and was ratified by Executive Yuan in February 1982.

The Scenic Area was founded on 1 June 1984 and promoted to a National Scenic Area on 1 July 1995.

Administration
The duties of the Northeast Coast National Scenic Area Administration include maintenance and patrol of the area. They also provide information and services, such as online applications for:

 Visiting Gueishan Island
 Pleasure-boat sailing and docking at ports of the Longdongwan preservation area.
 A multimedia guide to the Scenic Area

The Administration Office is located at No. 36 Singlong St., Fulong Village, Gongliao Country, just near the Fulong Bathing Beach.

Scenic spots
 Jinguashi and Jiufen, the main gold mining site of Taiwan during the Qing Dynasty and Japanese rule.
 Bitou Cape
 Longdongwan Bay
 Yanliao Beach Park and golden beaches
 Fulong Beach
 Lailai Rock Fishing Area around Shicheng Borough, Toucheng Town
 Caoliing Ancient Trail, a trail built during the Qing Dynasty between Dali Borough, Toucheng Town and Gongliao Country.
 Honeymoon Bay
 Gueishan Island, visiting the island or whale watching
 Beiguan Park, for watching crashing waves

External links
 Northeast Coast National Scenic Area Administration official website

1984 establishments in Taiwan
Tourist attractions in Taiwan
Geography of New Taipei
Tourist attractions in New Taipei
Geography of Yilan County, Taiwan
Tourist attractions in Yilan County, Taiwan
National scenic areas of Taiwan